The Bush Doctrine refers to multiple interrelated foreign policy principles of the 43rd President of the United States, George W. Bush. These principles include unilateralism, preemptive war, and regime change.

Charles Krauthammer first used the phrase in June 2001 to describe the Bush administration's "unilaterally withdrawing from the ABM treaty and rejecting the Kyoto protocol." After the 9/11 attack, the phrase described the policy that the United States had the right to secure itself against countries that harbor or give aid to terrorist groups, which was used to justify the 2001 invasion of Afghanistan. The Bush Doctrine became strongly associated with the Bush administration's decision to invade Iraq in 2003.

Different pundits have attributed different meanings to the Bush Doctrine. It was used to describe specific policy elements, including a strategy of "preemptive strikes" as a defense against an immediate or perceived future threat to the security of the United States. This policy principle was applied particularly in the Middle East to counter international terrorist organizations and to justify the invasion of Iraq.

Generally, the Bush Doctrine was used to indicate a willingness to unilaterally pursue U.S. economic interests. Some of these policies were codified in a National Security Council text entitled the National Security Strategy of the United States published on September 20, 2002.

The phrase "Bush Doctrine" was rarely used by members of the Bush administration. The expression was used at least once, though, by Vice President Dick Cheney, in a June 2003 speech in which he said, "If there is anyone in the world today who doubts the seriousness of the Bush Doctrine, I would urge that person to consider the fate of the Taliban in Afghanistan, and of Saddam Hussein's regime in Iraq."

National Security Strategy of the United States
The main elements of the Bush Doctrine were delineated in a document, the National Security Strategy of the United States, published on September 17, 2002. This document is often cited as the definitive statement of the doctrine. As updated in 2006, it states:

Components
The Bush Doctrine is defined as "a collection of strategy principles, practical policy decisions, and a set of rationales and ideas for guiding United States foreign policy." Some of these had reemerged from the 1992 draft Wolfowitz Doctrine, which had been leaked and disavowed by the first Bush administration; Wolfowitz, as deputy secretary of defense, was at the center of the new Bush administration's strategic planning. Two main pillars are identified for the doctrine: 1.) preemptive strikes against potential enemies and 2.) promoting democratic regime change.

The George W. Bush administration claimed that the US was locked in a global war; a war of ideology, in which its enemies are bound together by a common ideology and a common hatred of democracy.

Out of the National Security Strategy, four main points are highlighted as the core to the Bush Doctrine: 1.) Preemption, 2.) Military Primacy, 3.) New Multilateralism, and 4.) the Spread of Democracy.  The document emphasized preemption, stating, "America is now threatened less by conquering states than we are by failing ones. We are menaced less by fleets and armies than by catastrophic technologies in the hands of the embittered few", and required "defending the United States, the American people, and our interests at home and abroad by identifying and destroying the threat before it reaches our borders."

Defense Secretary Donald Rumsfeld remarked thus in 2006, in a statement taken to reflect his view of the Doctrine's efficacy: "If I were rating, I would say we probably deserve a D or D+ as a country as how well we're doing in the battle of ideas that's taking place. I'm not going to suggest that it's easy, but we have not found the formula as a country."

In his 2010 memoir Decision Points, President Bush articulates his discrete concept of the Bush Doctrine. He stated that his doctrine consisted of four "prongs", three of them practical, and one idealistic. They are the following: (In his words)
 "Make no distinction between terrorists and the nations that harbor them — and hold both to account."
 "Take the fight to the enemy overseas before they can attack us again here at home."
 "Confront threats before they fully materialize."
 "Advance liberty and hope as an alternative to the enemy's ideology of repression and fear."

Unilateralism
Unilateral elements were evident early in Bush's presidency. Conservative Charles Krauthammer, who coined the term "Bush Doctrine", deployed "unilateralism", in February 2001 to refer to Bush's increased unilateralism in foreign policy, specifically regarding his decision to withdraw from the ABM treaty.

There is some evidence that Bush's willingness for the US to act unilaterally came even earlier. The International Journal of Peace Studies 2003 article "The Bush administration's image of Europe: From ambivalence to rigidity" states:

Attacking countries that harbor terrorists

The doctrine was developed more fully as an executive branch response following the September 11 attacks. The attacks presented a foreign policy challenge, since it was not Afghanistan that had initiated the attacks, and there was no evidence that they had any foreknowledge of them. In an address to the nation on the evening of September 11, Bush stated his resolution of the issue by declaring that, "We will make no distinction between the terrorists who committed these acts and those who harbor them." The President made an even more aggressive restatement of this principle in his September 20, 2001 address to a Joint Session of Congress:

White House Press Secretary Ari Fleischer later wrote in an autobiographical account of that address, "In a speech hailed by the press and by Democrats, [the President] announced what became known as the 'Bush Doctrine'".  The first published reference after the 9/11 attacks to the terror-fighting doctrine appeared September 30 in an op-ed by political scientist Neal Coates.

This policy was used to justify the invasion of Afghanistan in October 2001, and has since been applied to American military action against Al Qaeda camps in North-West Pakistan.

Pre-emptive strikes
Bush addressed the cadets at the U.S. Military Academy (West Point) on June 1, 2002, and made clear the role pre-emptive war would play in the future of American foreign policy and national defense:

The stance of the Bush administration was that the harsh measures to spread the democracy worldwide are inevitable and efficacious, in which for instance, liberating Iraq will plant democracy in the area and enable it to flourish in the rest of the Middle East.

Two distinct schools of thought arose in the Bush administration regarding how to handle countries such as Iraq, Iran, and North Korea (the so-called "Axis of Evil" states). Secretary of State Colin Powell and National Security Advisor Condoleezza Rice, as well as U.S. Department of State specialists, argued for what was essentially the continuation of existing U.S. foreign policy. These policies, developed after the Cold War, sought to establish a multilateral consensus for action (which would likely take the form of increasingly harsh sanctions against the problem states, summarized as the policy of containment). The opposing view, argued by Vice President Dick Cheney, Secretary of Defense Donald Rumsfeld, and a number of influential Department of Defense policy makers like Paul Wolfowitz and Richard Perle, held that direct and unilateral action was both possible and justified and that America should embrace the opportunities for democracy and security offered by its position as sole remaining superpower.

Democratic regime change
In several speeches between late 2001 and 2002, Bush expanded on his view of the US foreign policy and global intervention, declaring that the US should actively support democratic governments around the world, especially in the Middle East, as a strategy for combating the threat of terrorism, and that the nation had to act unilaterally in its own security interests, without approval of international bodies like the United Nations. This represented a departure from the Cold War policies of deterrence and containment under the Truman Doctrine and post–Cold War philosophies such as the Powell Doctrine and the Clinton Doctrine.

In his 2003 State of the Union Address, Bush declared:

After his second inauguration, in a January 2006 speech at National Defense University, Bush said: "The defense of freedom requires the advance of freedom."

Neoconservatives and the Bush Doctrine held that the hatred for the West and the United States particularly exists not because of actions perpetrated by the US, but rather because the countries from which terrorists emerge are in social disarray and do not experience the freedom that is an intrinsic part of democracy. The Bush Doctrine holds that enemies of the US use terrorism as a war of ideology against the nation. The responsibility of the US is to protect itself by promoting democracy where the terrorists are located so as to undermine the basis for terrorist activities. The Elections in Egypt, Lebanon, and Palestine happened as a result of this initiative in the sense that Brotherhood, Hezbollah, and Hamas were allowed to participate in it.

Influences on the Bush Doctrine

Neoconservatives
The development of the doctrine was influenced by neoconservative ideology, and it was considered to be a step from the political realism of the Reagan Doctrine. The Reagan Doctrine was considered key to American foreign policy until the end of the Cold War, just before Bill Clinton became president of the United States. The Reagan Doctrine was considered anti-Communist and in opposition to Soviet Union global influence, but later spoke of a peace dividend towards the end of the Cold War with economic benefits of a decrease in defense spending. The Reagan Doctrine was strongly criticized  by the neoconservatives, who also became disgruntled with the outcome of the Gulf War and United States foreign policy under Bill Clinton, sparking them to call for change towards global stability through their support for active intervention and the democratic peace theory. Several central persons in the counsel to the George W. Bush administration considered themselves to be neoconservatives or strongly support their foreign policy ideas.

Neoconservatives are widely known to long have supported the overthrow of Saddam Hussein in Iraq, and on January 26, 1998, the Project for the New American Century (PNAC) sent a public letter to then-President Bill Clinton stating:

Among the signatories to PNAC's original statement of Principals is George H. W. Bush's Vice President Dan Quayle, George W. Bush's defense secretary Donald Rumsfeld, his deputy defense secretary Paul Wolfowitz, his Vice President Dick Cheney, and his brother Jeb Bush.

PNAC member and the chairman of the Defense Policy Board Advisory Committee (DPBAC), Neoconservative Richard Perle, later expressed regret over the Iraq invasion and ultimately put the blame for the invasion on President George W. Bush.

Other Bush cabinet members who are thought to have adopted neoconservative foreign policy thinking include Vice President Dick Cheney and Secretary of State Condoleezza Rice.

The Bush Doctrine, in line with long-standing neoconservative ideas, held that the United States is entangled in a global war of ideas between the western values of freedom on the one hand, and extremism seeking to destroy them on the other; a war of ideology where the United States must take responsibility for security and show leadership in the world by actively seeking out the enemies and also change those countries who are supporting enemies.

The Bush Doctrine, and neoconservative reasoning, held that containment of the enemy as under the realpolitik of Reagan did not work, and that the enemy of United States must be destroyed pre-emptively before they attack—using all the United States' available means, resources and influences to do so.

On the book Winning the War on Terror Dr. James Forest, U.S. Military Academy Combating Terrorism Center at West Point, comments: "While the West faces uncertainties in the struggle against militant Islam's armies of darkness, and while it is true that we do not yet know precisely how it will end, what has become abundantly clear is that the world will succeed in defeating militant Islam because of the West's flexible, democratic institutions and its all-encompassing ideology of freedom."

Natan Sharansky

Another part of the intellectual underpinning of the Bush Doctrine was the 2004 book The Case for Democracy, written by Israeli politician and author Natan Sharansky and Israeli Minister of Economic Affairs in the United States Ron Dermer, which Bush has cited as influential in his thinking. The book argues that replacing dictatorships with democratic governments is both morally justified since it leads to greater freedom for the citizens of such countries, and strategically wise, since democratic countries are more peaceful, and breed less terrorism than dictatorial ones.

Expanding United States influence
Princeton University research fellow Dr. Jonathan Monten, in his 2005 International Security journal article "The Roots of the Bush Doctrine: Power, Nationalism, and Democracy Promotion in U.S. Strategy", attributed the Bush administration's activist democracy promotion to two main factors: the expansion of material capabilities, and the presence of a nationalist domestic ideology. He claims that the Bush Doctrine's promotion of democracy abroad was held as vital by the Bush administration to the success of the United States in the "war on terror". It was also a key objective of the administration's grand strategy of expanding the political and economic influence of the United States internationally. He examines two contending approaches to the long-term promotion of democracy: "exemplarism", or leadership by example, and "vindicationism", or the direct application of United States power, including the use of coercive force. Whereas exemplarism largely prevailed in the 20th century, vindicationism has been the preferred approach of the Bush administration.

Criticism and analysis
The Bush Doctrine resulted in criticism and controversy.  Peter D. Feaver, who worked on the Bush national security strategy as a staff member on the National Security Council, said he has counted as many as seven distinct Bush doctrines. One of the drafters of the National Security Strategy of the United States, which is commonly mistakenly referred to as the "Bush Doctrine", demurred at investing the statement with too much weight. "I actually never thought there was a Bush doctrine", said Philip D. Zelikow, who later served as State Department counselor under Secretary of State Condoleezza Rice. "Indeed, I believe the assertion that there is such a doctrine lends greater coherence to the administration's policies than they deserve." Zbigniew Brzezinski, Jimmy Carter's national security adviser, said he thought there was no "single piece of paper" that represents the Bush Doctrine.

Experts on geopolitical strategy note that Halford Mackinder's theories in "The Geographical Pivot of History" about the "Heartland" and world resource control are still as valid today as when they were formulated.

In his 2007 book In the Defense of the Bush Doctrine, Robert G. Kaufman wrote: "No one grasped the logics or implications of this transformation better than Halford Mackinder. His prescient theories, first set forth in Geographical Pivot of History, published in 1904, have rightly shaped American grand strategy since World War II. Mackinder warned that any single power dominating Eurasia, "the World Island", as he called it, would have the potential to dominate the world, including the United States." Kaufman is a political scientist, public policy professor and member of The Shadow Financial Regulatory Committee. He said in an interview about the book: "I wrote this book because of my conviction that the Bush Doctrine has a more compelling logic and historical pedigree than people realize."

The Bush Doctrine was polarizing both domestically and internationally. In 2008, polls showed there was more anti-Americanism than before the Bush administration formed the Bush Doctrine; this increase was probably, at least partially, a result of implementing the Bush Doctrine and conservative foreign policy.

Foreign interventionism

The foreign policy of the Bush Doctrine was subject to controversy both in the United States and internationally.

John J. Mearsheimer argues in his book, The Great Delusion: Liberal Dreams and International Realities that a liberal hegemonic policy like the Bush Doctrine is ineffective at achieving its stated end goals and is doomed to lead to more war, anti-Americanism, and a global retreat in democracy.

Some critics of the policies were suspicious of the increasing willingness of the United States to use military force unilaterally.

Robert W. Tucker and David C. Hendrickson argued that it reflects a turn away from international law, and marks the end of American legitimacy in foreign affairs.

Others have stated that it could lead to other states resorting to the production of WMDs or terrorist activities.  This doctrine is argued to be contrary to the just war theory and would constitute a war of aggression. Patrick J. Buchanan wrote that the 2003 invasion of Iraq had significant similarities to the 1996 neoconservative policy paper A Clean Break: A New Strategy for Securing the Realm.

Political scientist Karen Kwiatkowski in 2007 wrote in her article "Making Sense of the Bush Doctrine":

We are killing terrorists in self-defense and for the good of the world, you see. We are taking over foreign countries, setting them up with our favorite puppets "in charge," controlling their economy, their movements, their dress codes, their defensive projects, and their dreams, solely because we love them, and apparently can't live without them.

Radical departure
According to Buchanan and others, the Bush Doctrine was a radical departure from former United States foreign policies, and a continuation of the ideological roots of neoconservatism.

Initially, support for the United States was high, but by the end of the Bush administration, after seven years of war, anti-Americanism was high and criticism of the Bush Doctrine was widespread; nonetheless the doctrine still had support among some United States political leaders.

The representation of prominent neoconservatives and their influences on the Bush Doctrine had been highly controversial among the American public.

Critics, like John Micklethwait in the book The Right Nation, claim that Bush was deceived by neoconservatives into adopting their policies.

Polarization
Anti-war critics have claimed that the Bush Doctrine was strongly polarizing domestically, had estranged allies of the United States, and belied Bush's stated desire to be a "uniter, not a divider".

Compassionate belief and religious influence
Bush often talked about his belief in compassionate conservatism and liberty as "God's gift". In his Claremont Institute article Democracy and the Bush Doctrine, Charles R. Kesler wrote, "As he begins his second term, the president and his advisors must take a hard, second look at the Bush Doctrine. In many respects, it is the export version of compassionate conservatism."

Sociopsychological strategy and effects
There is also criticism on Bush Doctrine practices related to their sociopsychological effects saying they create a culture of fear.

Naomi Klein wrote in her book The Shock Doctrine about a recurrent metaphor of shock, and she claimed in an interview that the Bush administration continued to exploit a "window of opportunity that opens up in a state of shock", followed by a comforting rationale for the public, as a form of social control.

Democratization
Some commentators argue that the Bush Doctrine has not aimed to support genuine democratic regimes driven by local peoples, but rather US-friendly regimes installed by diplomats acting on behalf of the United States and intended only to seem democratic to U.S. voters. For example, in the case of Afghanistan, it is argued that parliamentary democracy was downplayed by the US and power concentrated in the hands of the Afghan president Hamid Karzai, a US ally. The election of Karzai has been described as the result of manipulation on the parts of the US government and US policy maker Zalmay Khalilzad. At the same time, these commentators draw attention to the number of unpopular (but US-friendly) warlords achieving "legitimating" positions under US supervision of the elections. Some commentators interpreted voter turnout figures as evidence of "large-scale fraud". Sonali Kolhatkar and James Ingalls have written, "It remains to be seen if U.S. policymakers will ever allow anything approaching democracy to break out in Afghanistan and interfere with their plans."

Of the elections in Afghanistan, Sima Samar, former Afghan Minister for Women's Affairs, stated, "This is not a democracy, it is a rubber stamp. Everything has already been decided by the powerful ones."

Most studies of American intervention have been pessimistic about the history of the United States exporting democracy. John A. Tures examined 228 cases of American intervention from 1973 to 2005, using Freedom House data. While in 63 cases a country did become more democratic, in 69 instances the country became less democratic - and the plurality of interventions, 96, caused no change in the country's democracy.

See also
 American imperialism
 Monroe Doctrine
 Truman Doctrine
 Carter Doctrine
 Clinton Doctrine
 Jus ad bellum
 Military intervention
 Obama Doctrine
 Powell Doctrine
 Reagan Doctrine
 Foreign policy of the Donald Trump administration
 The One Percent Doctrine
 United States Presidential doctrines
 War on Terrorism
 Weinberger Doctrine
 Wolfowitz Doctrine

References

Further reading
 Bacevich, Andrew J. The New American Militarism: How Americans Are Seduced By War, New York & London, Oxford University Press, 2005. 
 Bennett, William J. Why We Fight: Moral Clarity and the War on Terrorism, New York, Regnery Publishing, Inc., 2003. 
 Chernus, Ira Monsters To Destroy: The Neoconservative War on Terror and Sin, Boulder, CO, Paradigm Publishers, 2006 
 
 
 Donnelly, Thomas The Military We Need: The Defense Requirements of the Bush Doctrine, Washington, D.C., American Enterprise Institute Press, 2005. 
 Gaddis, John Lewis Surprise, Security, and the American Experience, Cambridge, MA, Harvard University Press, 2004. 
 Grandin, Greg Empire's Workshop: Latin America, The United States, and the Rise of the New Imperialism, New York, Metropolitan Press, 2006. 
 
 Kaplan, Lawrence and William Kristol The War over Iraq: Saddam's Tyranny and America's Mission, San Francisco, Encounter Books, 2003. 
 Kolodziej, Edward A. and Roger E. Kanet (eds.)  From Superpower to Besieged Global Power:  Restoring World Order after the Failure of the Bush Doctrine, Athens, GA, University of Georgia Press, 2008.  
 Meiertöns, Heiko. The Doctrines of US Security Policy - An Evaluation under International Law, Cambridge University Press, 2010. .
 Monten, Jonathan. "The Roots of the Bush Doctrine: Power, Nationalism, and Democracy Promotion in U.s. Strategy" International Security 29#4 (2005), pp. 112–156 in JSTOR
 Shanahan, Timothy (ed.) Philosophy 9/11: Thinking about the War on Terrorism, Chicago & LaSalle, IL, Open Court, 2005 
 Smith, Grant F. Deadly Dogma, Washington, DC, Institute for Research: Middle Eastern Policy, 2006. 
 Tremblay, Rodrigue The New American Empire, West Conshohocken, PA, Infinity, 2004, 
 Weisberg, Jacob The Bush Tragedy, Random House, 2008. 
 Woodward, Bob Plan of Attack, New York, Simon & Schuster, 2004. 
 Wright, Steven. The United States and Persian Gulf Security: The Foundations of the War on Terror, Ithaca Press, 2007 
 Zoughbie, DE. Indecision Points: George W. Bush and the Israeli-Palestinian Conflict (MIT Press, 2014),

External links
 
 
 
 
 
 
 
  Dissident President April 2006

Presidency of George W. Bush
History of the foreign relations of the United States
2001 in the United States
2001 in international relations
Foreign policy doctrines of the United States
Political terminology of the United States